

T

T–Ta 

  (/)
  (/)
  (/)
 
 
 
 
 
  (//)
 
  (//, /, /)
  (/)
  (/)
 
 
 
 
 
  (//)
 
 
 
 
  (//)
  (/)
  (/)
 
  (/, /)
 
 
  (/)
  (/)
 
  (/)
 
 
  (//)
 
  (/)
  (/)
  (/)
 
  (//)
 
  (///, //)
 
 
 
  (//)
 
 

 
 
 
 
 
 
 
  (/)
 
 
 
  (///)
 
 
 
 
 
 
 
 
 
  (//)
 
  (/)
 
  (/)
  (/)
 
  (/)
 
 
 
 
  (/)
  (/)
  (/)
 
  (//)

Tc–Te 

 
  (/)
  (/)
  (/)
 
 
 
  (/)
 
  (/)
 
 
  (/)
 
  (/)
 
 
 
 
  (/)
 
  (/)
 
 
  (/)
  (/)
  (/)
 
  (//)
 
 
 
 
  (//)
 
  (//)
 
 
 
  (/)

Th

 
 
 
 
 

 
 
 
 
 
  (/)
 
 
  (//)
 
 
  (/)
 
 
  (/)
 
  (//)
 
 
  (/, T-AGOR-23)
 
 
 
 
  (/)
  (/, /)
 
 
  (/)
 
 
 
  (/)
  (/)
 
 
 
 
  (/)
  (/)
 
  (/)
 
  (/, /)
  (//)
 
  (/)
 
  
 

Ti–Tl 

 
  
  (/)
 
 
 
 
  (//)
 
  (//)
 
 
 
  (ORV-17/)
  (//)
 
 
  (/)
  (//)
 
 
 
  (/)
 
  (/)
 
 
 
 
  (/)
 USS Tivives (1911)
 
 
  (/)

To

 
 
 
 
 
  (//)
  (/)
 
 
  (/)
  (//)
  (/)
  (/)
 
 
  (/)
 
 
 
 
  (/)
  (/)
 
 
 
 
 
 
  (/)
 
  (/, /)
  (//)
 
 
  (/)
  (/)
  (/)
 
 
 
  (/)
  (//)
 
 
 
  (/)
 
 
 
 
 
  (/)
  (//)
 
 
 

Tr

 USS Trabajador (1931)
 

  (/)
 
 
  (/)
 
 
 MV Transpacific 
 
 
 
 
 
  (/)
 
 
 
 
 
 
  (/)
  (/)
  (//)
 
 
 
 
 
 
 
 
 
 
 
  (//)
  (/)
 
  (/)
 
  (//)
 
 
 

 USS Troup (1812)
 
 
 USS Troy (ID-1614)
 
  (/)
  (//)
  (1776 galley, 1776 frigate)
 
 
 
  (/, /)
 

Ts-Tu

 
 
 
  (/)
 
 
 
  (/)
 
 
 
 
 
  (/)
 
 
 

  (///)
  (/)
 
 
 
 
  (//, /)
  (/)
 
 
 USS Turtle (1775, DSV-3)
 
 
  (///)
  (/)
 
 
 
  (/)
  (/)
 
 
 
  (/)
 
 
 
 
 
 
 
 

U 

 USS U-111 
 USS U-117 
 USS U-140 
 USS U-2513 
 USS U-3008 
 USS UB-148 
 USS UB-88 
 USS UC-97 
 
 
 
  (//)
 
 
 
 
  (/)
  (/)
 
  (/, /)
  (///)
 
 
  (/)
 
 
 
  (///)
  (/)
 
 
 
  (/)
  (/)
 
 
 
 
  (/)
  (///)
  (/)
 
 

V
  (/)
  (/)
  (/)
 
  (/)
  (/)
  (/)
 
 
 

Va

 
  (//)
 
  (/)
  (/)
 
 
 
 
 
  (/)
 
  (///)
  (//)
 
 
 
 
  (/)
 
 
 
  (//)
 
 
 
 
  (/)
  (/)
  (/)
 
 
 
 
 
 

Ve

 
 
 
  (/)
  (//)
 
  (/)
 
 
 
 
 
 
 
 
 
 
 
  (/)
 
 
  (/)
  (/)
 
 
 
 
  (/)
 
  (/)
 
 

Vi

  (/)
 
 
 
 
 
 
 
 
  (/)
  (/)
 
  (/)
 
 
 
 
 
 
 
  (/)
 
 
 
  (//, /)
  (/) 
 
  (//)
 
 
  (/)
 
 
 
 
 

Vo–Vu 
  (/)
 
 
 
 
 
 
  (/)
 

External links 
 navy.mil: List of homeports and their ships
 Dictionary of American Naval Fighting Ships
  Naval Vessel Register